Ramo Kolenović (7 August 1927-2015) was a Montenegrin kayaker. He is a member of Kayak club Zmaj, Zemun. He lived in Zemun, Serbia. He won the most medals in former Yugoslavia.

International successes

Yugoslavian champions 
K-1 10000 m
 1st place: 1956, 1959
 2nd place: 1954, 1957, 1958, 1961, 1964
 3rd place: 1960, 1963
 K-2 10000 m
 1st place: 1961
 2nd place: 1962
K-4 10000 m
 2nd place: 1964
K-1 1000 m
 2nd place: 1958
K-4 1000 m
 1st place: 1960, 1962
K-1 500 m
 2nd place: 1958
 K-1 4x500 m
 1st place: 1963
 2nd place: 1959, 1961, 1963
 3rd place: 1960

International champions 
 1954 – Kayak-canoe international contest in Zemun, Serbia
 bronze medal for 10000 meters
 1956 – Kayak-canoe international contest in London
 bronze medal for 10000 meters
 1956 – Kayak-canoe international contest in Brčko, Bosnia and Herzegovina
 silver medal for 10000 meters
 1960 – Kayak-canoe international contest in Brčko, Bosnia and Herzegovina
 gold medal for 10000 meters

Gallery

References

Kayakers
Serbian male canoeists
1927 births
2015 deaths